Georgios Iatridis was a Greek fencer. He participated in the 1896 Summer Olympics in Athens. Iatridis competed in the sabre event. In the five-man, round-robin tournament, he lost all four of his matches. He was defeated by Ioannis Georgiadis, Adolf Schmal, Telemachos Karakalos and Holger Nielsen, taking last place.

References

External links

Year of birth missing
Year of death missing
Fencers at the 1896 Summer Olympics
19th-century sportsmen
Olympic fencers of Greece
Greek male sabre fencers
Place of birth missing
Place of death missing